Kordon is a rural locality (a selo) in Kordonsky Selsoviet, Zalesovsky District, Altai Krai, Russia. The population was 646 as of 2013. There are 18 streets.

Geography 
Kordon is located 38 km northeast of Zalesovo (the district's administrative centre) by road. Peshcherka is the nearest rural locality.

References 

Rural localities in Zalesovsky District